Wheat Montana is a family owned Montana corporation that includes wheat farming, flour milling, production of sliced bread and hamburger buns, as well as multiple deli locations throughout the state. Owned by the Folkvord family, the company is an example of local value-added manufacturing.

They are located in Three Forks, in southwestern Montana.

References

http://www.wheatmontana.com
https://www.wheatmontana.com/about.php

Agriculture in Montana
Privately held companies based in Montana
Defunct manufacturing companies based in Montana
Three Forks, Montana
Restaurants in Montana